Tânia Raquel de Queiroz Muniz (born 24 July 1963) better known as Raquel Muniz, is a Brazilian politician as well as a medic and teacher. She has spent her political career representing her home state of Minas Gerais, having served in the chamber of deputies from 2015 to 2019.

Personal life
Muniz was born to Elza Gonçalves de Queiroz. Prior to becoming a politician Muniz worked as a medic and teacher.

Political career
Muniz voted in favor of the impeachment motion of then-president Dilma Rousseff. Muniz would vote against a similar corruption investigation into Rousseff's successor Michel Temer. She voted in favor of the 2017 Brazilian labor reforms.

In April 2018 Muniz was nominated to be head of the newly formed cultural committee in the federal chamber of deputies.

References

1963 births
Living people
People from Montes Claros
Social Christian Party (Brazil) politicians
Social Democratic Party (Brazil, 2011) politicians
Members of the Chamber of Deputies (Brazil) from Minas Gerais
Brazilian women in politics
Brazilian physicians
Brazilian educators